The Shawler Brook is a small creek that converges with Center Brook in New Berlin, New York. The Center Brook flows into the Unadilla River.

References

Rivers of New York (state)
Rivers of Chenango County, New York